Tamara Holmes (born June 2, 1974) is a baseball player who competed with the Colorado Silver Bullets and the United States women's national baseball team which won a gold medal at the 2015 Pan American Games. Heading into 2015, she has hit more home runs that any other women's baseball player.

Playing career

Baseball
Holmes’ first experience with baseball occurred at Albany Little League in California. In 1986, she was named to the Little League All-Star Team. In 1996, she joined the Colorado Silver Bullets during their final season of play. On May 15, 1996, she hit the first and only home run in Silver Bullets history. It occurred at the University of Georgia's Foley Field against the Atlanta Mustangs, and it was also a grand slam. In 2004, she played for the United States at the inaugural IBAF Women's World Cup. At the 2010 Women's World Cup, Holmes hit three home runs, two of which were grand slams. She was recognized as the Offensive Player of the Tournament. On the 2014 World Cup roster, she was the only former Silver Bullets player still with Team USA.

Volleyball
Holmes accepted a volleyball scholarship to compete with the Cal Golden Bears.

Personal
Her older sister Andrea ran track in high school and accepted a scholarship to Boise State. Holmes graduated from the University of California in 2001 and was employed as a firefighter.
Holmes is co-owner of a crossfit and olympic lifting gym in Oakland California, where she is highly respected for her excellent coaching of athletes at every level. She got married July 1, 2016 to Carrie Holmes of Sacramento.

Awards and honors
 2010 Women's World Cup of Baseball Home Run Trophy
 2010 Women's World Cup of Baseball Offensive Player of the Tournament
 2012 Women's World Cup of Baseball All-Tournament Team

Bibliography

References

External links 
 Tamara Holmes on Team USA

American female baseball players
Baseball outfielders
Baseball players from Berkeley, California
1974 births
Living people
Baseball players at the 2015 Pan American Games
Pan American Games gold medalists for the United States
Pan American Games medalists in baseball
Medalists at the 2015 Pan American Games
21st-century American women